Mosaiculia is a genus of moths belonging to the subfamily Tortricinae of the family Tortricidae. It consists of only one species, Mosaiculia mosaica, which is found in Ecuador (Morona-Santiago Province).

The wingspan is about 22 mm. The ground colour of the forewings is cream white, mixed with brownish and with black markings. The hindwings are mixed cream brownish terminally. The strigulation is cream brownish.

Etymology
The generic name refers to the markings of the forewings and is derived from Latin mosaicus (meaning mosaic) and the name of the related genus Eulia. The species name also refers to the markings of forewing.

See also
List of Tortricidae genera

References

Euliini